Kate Thompson (Born 17 November 1959)  is an actress and romantic novelist who also writes as Pixie Pirelli (the writer heroine of Sex, Lies and Fairytales).

Biography
She was born in Belfast, Northern Ireland, and studied English and French at Trinity College Dublin.

She spent many years as an actress in theatre and television, most notably in the Irish drama serial Glenroe. She married the actor Malcolm Douglas in 1985 and has a daughter Clara (born 1987). In 1989 she won the Best Actress Award in the Dublin Theatre Festival. Her first novel, It Means Mischief, was published in 1999. The Blue Hour was shortlisted for the Parker Romantic Novel of the Year.

Her light-hearted novels feature characters involved in the arts and business, living between the South of France and Connemara, whose romances and lives have grown in the Celtic Tiger years and the successive austerity.

Works
It Means Mischief (1999)
More Mischief (2000)
Going Down (2001)
The Blue Hour (2002)
Striking Poses (2003)
A Perfect Life (2004)
Living the Dream (2004)
Sex, Lies and Fairytales (2005)
Hard to Choos (2006) (as Pixie Pirelli)
Love Lies Bleeding (2007)
Star Gazing (2008)
The Kinsella Sisters (2009)
O'hara Affair (2010)
That Gallagher Girl (2011)

References

External links
Official website of Kate Thompson
Official website of Pixie Pirelli

1959 births
Living people
Romantic fiction writers from Northern Ireland
Women novelists from Northern Ireland
Television actresses from Northern Ireland
Stage actresses from Northern Ireland
Soap opera actresses from Northern Ireland
21st-century women writers from Northern Ireland
Actresses from Belfast
Date of birth missing (living people)
Women romantic fiction writers
21st-century novelists from Northern Ireland